Andrew Turner (born January 11, 1978) is a lacrosse player for the Edmonton Rush in the National Lacrosse League.

He plays for the Victoria Shamrocks in the Western Lacrosse Association during the summer. He has been named Best Defensive Player three times in 2001, 2003, and in 2005. In 2003 he was named Playoff MVP and also won the Mike Kelly Memorial Trophy as the Mann Cup MVP. He is a two-time Mann Cup champion.  In 2007 he made his fourth appearance in the NLL All-star game.

Statistics

NLL

Awards

References

1978 births
Living people
Canadian lacrosse players
Edmonton Rush players
Lacrosse people from Ontario
National Lacrosse League All-Stars
National Lacrosse League major award winners
People from the Regional Municipality of Niagara
Rochester Knighthawks players